David Borrelli may refer to:

 David Borrelli (ice hockey) (born 1981), Canadian-born Italian ice hockey player
 David Borrelli (politician) (born 1971), Italian politician